Sarbaz Velayat, is an Iranian future soldier program which was unveiled in late 2014 at the IPAS-2014 exhibition. It aims to provide soldiers with new individual communications, data management computer, navigation systems, new body armor and helmets, new 5.56mm assault rifle and advanced weapon accessories. The program is expected to be expensive, and it is anticipated to become operational in near future within special operation forces within the IRGC.  The system includes protective gear including integrated sensors and a wrist-worn computer for real-time video access to the unit commander, as well as data about health status, ammunition, and other pertinent information broadcast to the commander to better assess the battlefield scenario and assist in decision making.

References

Projects established in 2014
Future soldier programs
Military of Iran